Hum Tum Aur Woh (We Three) is a 1938 Hindi/Urdu social drama film. The film was directed by Mehboob Khan for Sagar Movietone. The music was composed by Anil Biswas with lyrics by Wajahat Mirza and Zia Sarhadi. The cinematographer was Faredoon Irani. The film starred Motilal, Maya Banerjee, Rose, Yakub and Sankatha Prasad. The film was a romantic triangle involving Moti (Motilal), Bina (Maya Bannerjee) the girl he's engaged to and Leela (Rose) who is obsessed with him.

Plot
Moti (Motilal) is engaged to Bina (Maya Banerjee), but gets involved with Leela (Rose), who is passionate about him. She declares her love for Moti without guilt and goes on to have his child out of wedlock. Her traumatised father suggests that she commit suicide to avoid shame and harassment from society. Bina decides to break off her engagement with Moti in order for him to marry Leela. But Moti goes after Bina and is told by her father that Bina is dead. Leela makes the final sacrifice, letting Moti go to Bina.

Cast
Motilal as Moti
Maya as Bina
Rose as Leela
Yakub
Sankatha Prasad as Bina's father
Pande as Leela's father
Sunalini Devi
Bhudo Advani

Songs

References

External links

1938 films
1930s Hindi-language films
Films directed by Mehboob Khan
Indian drama films
1938 drama films
Indian black-and-white films
Hindi-language drama films